Nagatinsky Zaton is a metro station on the Bolshaya Koltsevaya line of the Moscow Metro, between Klenovy Bulvar and Pechatniki. The name of the station derives from Nagatinsky Zaton District where it is located. The station was opened on 1 March 2023. The construction started in 2017.

References

Moscow Metro stations
Railway stations in Russia opened in 2022
Bolshaya Koltsevaya line
Railway stations located underground in Russia